662 Newtonia is a minor planet orbiting the Sun.

References

External links
 
 

Background asteroids
Newtonia
19080330
Newtonia